Christopher William Tancill (born February 7, 1968) is an American former professional ice hockey right winger who played in the National Hockey League (NHL).

Biography
Tancill was born in Livonia, Michigan. As a youth, he played in the 1981 Quebec International Pee-Wee Hockey Tournament with a minor ice hockey team from Southfield, Michigan.

Tancill was drafted by the Hartford Whalers in the 1989 NHL Supplemental Draft. After playing four seasons at the University of Wisconsin–Madison, Tancill made his professional debut with the American Hockey League's Springfield Indians in the 1990–91 season and was one of the stars leading the team to the Calder Cup championship in that year. He also made his NHL debut with the Whalers that same season, appearing in nine games, scoring one goal and adding one assist.

Tancill was traded to the Detroit Red Wings during the 1991–92 season in exchange for Daniel Shank.  For the 1993–94 season, he joined the Dallas Stars. After one season with the Stars, he spent three with the San Jose Sharks organization.

Tancill played in two more NHL games with the Dallas Stars during the 1997–98 season. He then went to Switzerland and spent six seasons in Nationalliga A. He retired following the 2003–04 season.

In his NHL career, Tancill appeared in 134 games. He scored 17 goals and added 32 assists. He also appeared in 11 Stanley Cup playoff games, scoring one goal and adding one assist.

Awards and honors

Career statistics

Regular season and playoffs

International

References

External links

1968 births
Adirondack Red Wings players
American men's ice hockey right wingers
Dallas Stars players
Detroit Red Wings players
EV Zug players
Hartford Whalers draft picks
Hartford Whalers players
Ice hockey players from Michigan
Sportspeople from Livonia, Michigan
Kalamazoo Wings (1974–2000) players
Kansas City Blades players
Kentucky Thoroughblades players
EHC Kloten players
Living people
National Hockey League supplemental draft picks
San Jose Sharks players
SC Rapperswil-Jona Lakers players
Springfield Indians players
Wisconsin Badgers men's ice hockey players
NCAA men's ice hockey national champions